

Wulfheard (died ) was a medieval Bishop of Hereford. He was consecrated between 799 and 801 and died between 822 and 824. In 801 he made a profession of obedience to Æthelhard, the Archbishop of Canterbury.

Notes

Citations

References

External links
 

Bishops of Hereford
9th-century English bishops
820s deaths
Year of birth unknown